Acrocercops pentalocha is a moth of the family Gracillariidae, known from Karnataka, India. It was described by Edward Meyrick in 1912. The hostplant for the species is Mangifera indica.

References

pentalocha
Moths of Asia
Moths described in 1912